Tyrell Richard (born August 4, 1997) is an American athlete. He competed in the mixed 4 × 400 metres relay event at the 2019 World Athletics Championships, winning the gold medal.

As a senior at South Carolina State in 2019, Richard won the men's 400-metre title at the 2019 NCAA Division I Indoor Track and Field Championships with a time of 44.82 seconds, which set a new school and MEAC record.

Personal life
He has two brothers who played football at SC State: Donovan set the school career tackles record before playing on the Jacksonville Jaguars practice squad and Tevin set the school record for blocked kicks in a season.

References

External links

1997 births
Living people
American male sprinters
College men's track and field athletes in the United States
People from Georgetown, South Carolina
South Carolina State University alumni
Track and field athletes from South Carolina
World Athletics Championships athletes for the United States
World Athletics Championships medalists
World Athletics Championships winners